Husky Be My Guide is a travel book by F. J. Thwaites. It was the first in a series of travel books written by Thwaites based on his real-life adventures.

Plot

In 1955, author F. J. Thwaites, his wife Jessica Harcourt and their son, drive from London to Sydney. The trip was made in a Hillman Husky.

Press on Regardless

Press on Regardless is a travel book by F. J. Thwaites. It was a sequel to Husky Be My Guide and involved a car trip through Canada and South America.

Destination Spain

Destination Spain is another travel book by F. J. Thwaites.

Tracks I Knew Not

Tracks I Knew Not is a travel book by F. J. Thwaites. It was the last work of Thwaites' published in his lifetime.

References

External links
Husky Be My Guide at AustLit
Press on Regardless at AustLit
Destination Spain at AustLit
Tracks I Knew Not at AustLit

Australian travel books